"Dangerous Corner" is a 1965 Australian television play based on the play Dangerous Corner by J.B. Priestley. It was filmed in Melbourne.

Premise
A suicide and an empty cigarette case spark an emotional powder keg in a family.

Cast
Dorothy Bradley as Olwen
Maxwell Jackson as Robert
Amanda Fox as Freda
Judith Arthy as Betty
David Mitchell as Gordon
Charles Stanton as Keith
Sheila Florance as Miss Mockridge
Keith Lee

Production
Amanda Fox was an English actress who was born when her father was appearing in the original stage production of Dangerous Corner.

Reception
The Sydney Morning Herald wrote that "After 30 years or so the play still has its internal fascination as an ingenious piece of stagecraft, but the present cast was totally unable to recapture the quietly sinister implications of the original production and substituted shouting and overacting."

References

External links
 
 Dangerous Corner at National Film and Sound Archive

1965 television plays
1965 Australian television episodes
1960s Australian television plays
Wednesday Theatre (season 1) episodes